Mantapamapalle is a village in Vontimitta mandal of Kadapa district of Andhra Pradesh, India.

References 

Villages in Kadapa district